#1 Suspect is the debut album by Memphis gangsta rapper, Gangsta Pat, released on Atlantic records during the early months of 1991.

Track listing 
 #1 Suspect
 Gangstas Need Love 2
 Legion of Doom
 Homicide
 Shootin' on Narcs
 Incarcerated
 I'm tha Gangsta
 Gangsta Shit
 Project Pimps
 You Can't Get None

Gangsta Pat albums
1991 debut albums